Packera ionophylla is an uncommon species of flowering plant in the aster family known by the common name Tehachapi ragwort. It is endemic to California, where it is known from the Tehachapi Mountains, the San Gabriel and San Bernardino Mountains, and Alamo Mountain near the Grapevine. It grows in mountain forest habitat.

It is a perennial herb producing one or more erect stems up to 30 to 50 centimeters tall from a rhizome or taproot and caudex unit. It is slightly hairy to woolly or cobwebby in texture. The thick leaves have lobed blades one or two centimeters long borne on petioles. The inflorescence holds one or more flower heads containing many disc florets and usually several ray florets, though these may be absent.

External links
Jepson Manual Treatment: Packera ionophylla
USDA Plants Profile
Flora of North America
Packera ionophylla - U.C. Photo gallery

ionophylla
Endemic flora of California
Flora of the Sierra Nevada (United States)
Natural history of the Transverse Ranges
~
~
~
Taxa named by Edward Lee Greene
Flora without expected TNC conservation status